The Roman Catholic Diocese of Panevėžys is a diocese located in the city of Panevėžys in the Ecclesiastical province of Vilnius in Lithuania. It was established on April 4, 1926 from the Diocese of Samogitia. The Christ the King Cathedral is the Bishop's Cathedral of the diocese since the declaration of Pope Pius XI in 1926.

Leadership
 Bishops of Panevėžys (Latin Church)
 Bishop Linas Vodopjanovas, O.F.M. (elect)
 Bishop Lionginas Virbalas, SI (2013-08-10 – 2015-06-11) 
 Bishop Jonas Kauneckas (2002-01-05 – 2013-06-06)
 Bishop Juozas Preikšas (1991-12-24 – 2002-01-05)
 Bishop Juozas Preikšas (Apostolic Administrator 1989-04-02 – 1991-12-24)
 Liudvikas Povilonis 1983–1984;
 Bishop Romualdas Krikščiūnas (Apostolic Administrator 1973-07-06 – 1983-05-15)
 Bishop Kaziemiras Paltarokas (1926-04-05 – 1957-12-08)

References

External links

 Diocese website
 GCatholic.org
 Catholic Hierarchy

Roman Catholic dioceses in Lithuania
Christian organizations established in 1926
Culture in Panevėžys
Roman Catholic dioceses and prelatures established in the 20th century